Robert Keith Kessinger (born February 19, 1967) is a former Major League Baseball player who played 11 games at shortstop for the Cincinnati Reds in 1993. He was drafted by the Baltimore Orioles in the 36th round of the 1989 amateur draft, and the Reds purchased his contract in 1991. His ML debut came on September 15, 1993 against the Atlanta Braves. Kessinger went 1 for 2 in the game.

Kessinger was the head baseball coach at Arkansas State University from July 2002 to June 2008, compiling a 148–178 record. He spent the two years prior to that as head coach at Carson-Newman College where he compiled a 66–47 record. He also served as an assistant baseball coach at the University of Mississippi for four seasons, where he had previously been a second-team All SEC shortstop.

Keith's father, Don Kessinger, is a former major league baseball player at shortstop and a six-time all-star. His nephew Grae Kessinger is a minor league player at shortstop.

See also
 List of second generation MLB players

Career statistics

References

External links

1967 births
Living people
Major League Baseball shortstops
Baseball players from Arkansas
Cincinnati Reds players
Wausau Timbers players
Arkansas State Red Wolves baseball coaches
Ole Miss Rebels baseball coaches
Ole Miss Rebels baseball players
Carson–Newman Eagles baseball coaches